Clayton Jacobson (born 26 October 1963) is an Australian film director, writer, producer, actor, musician and editor. His debut feature film was Kenny. Kenny was released in 2006 in Australia to critical acclaim, winning a number of awards.

Jacobson has also acted in a number of films, including 2010's Animal Kingdom. He is the brother of Kenny actor Shane Jacobson. He also plays bass in the Appalachian folk band The Duck Downpickers.

Career

Clayton Jacobson graduated from the Swinburne Film & TV School in the mid 80’s. He began his career editing music videos and features films. He then directed music videos, television commercials, and short films until making his debut as a feature film director with Kenny in 2006.

Filmography

As director, producer, and writer

As editor

As actor

Awards and nominations

Kenny

Kenny received several awards and nominations.

 Australian Film Institute (AFI) 2006
Nominated - Best Film (Clayton Jacobson, Rohan Timlock), Best Direction (Clayton Jacobson), Best Original Screenplay (Shane Jacobson, Clayton Jacobson), Best Editing (Clayton Jacobson, Sean Lander), Best Supporting Actor (Ronald Jacobson);
 Won - Best Lead Actor (Shane Jacobson);
 Film Critics Circle of Australia 2006
Won - Best Actor (Shane Jacobson), Best Original Screenplay;
Nominated: Best Film, Best Director;
 if Awards 2006
Won - Best Feature Film, Best Script (Clayton Jacobson, Shane Jacobson), Best Sound (Craig Carter, Peter Smith), Box Office Achievement;
Nominated - Best Director (Clayton Jacobsen), Best Editing (Clayton Jacobson, Sean Lander);

References

Australian film directors
Living people
1963 births